Annarita Sidoti (25 July 1969 – 21 May 2015) was an Italian race walker.

Biography
Annarita Sidoti was born in Gioiosa Marea. She won eleven medals at senior level in international competition. She participated at three editions of the Summer Olympics (1992, 1996, 2000), and earned 47 caps in fifteen years in the national team from 1987 to 2002.

She appeared in the film Le complici (1998) by director Emanuela Piovano, in which she played a prostitute.

Death
She died in May 2015 in Gioiosa Marea, Italy, of metastatic breast cancer, which had spread to her liver and brain. She was 45 years old.

International competitions

National titles
She won ten times at the Italian Athletics Championships.
 1 win in the 5 km walk (1995)
 1 win in the 10 km walk (1991)
 4 wins in the 20 km walk (1992, 1995, 2000, 2002)
 4 wins in the 3000 metres walk indoor (1991, 1994, 2001, 2002)

See also
 Italy at the European Race Walking Cup - Multiple medalists
 Italian all-time lists – 20 km walk
 FIDAL Hall of Fame

Notes
 Sources give her age at death as 44, but this is contradicted by widespread record of her year of birth as 1969 throughout the entirely of her career (by international and national athletics federations and Olympic scholars) and before publication of her death.

References

External links
 

 Annarita Sidoti at RAI web site
 Annarita Sidoti at La marcia nel mondo 

1969 births
2015 deaths
Sportspeople from the Province of Messina
Italian female racewalkers
Olympic athletes of Italy
Athletes (track and field) at the 1992 Summer Olympics
Athletes (track and field) at the 1996 Summer Olympics
Athletes (track and field) at the 2000 Summer Olympics
World Athletics Championships athletes for Italy
World Athletics Championships medalists
European Athletics Championships medalists
Universiade medalists in athletics (track and field)
Deaths from cancer in Sicily
Deaths from breast cancer
Mediterranean Games silver medalists for Italy
Mediterranean Games medalists in athletics
Athletes (track and field) at the 1997 Mediterranean Games
Universiade gold medalists for Italy
Universiade bronze medalists for Italy
World Athletics Championships winners
Medalists at the 1991 Summer Universiade
Medalists at the 1995 Summer Universiade
Medalists at the 1997 Summer Universiade